Sheldonia  is a genus of air-breathing land snails, terrestrial gastropod mollusks in the family Urocyclidae. Sheldonia is the type genus of the subfamily Sheldoniinae.

Distribution 
The distribution of this genus includes South Africa.

Species 
Species within the genus Sheldonia include:
 Sheldonia fuscicolor (Melvill & Ponsonby, 1892)
 Sheldonia puzeyi Connolly, 1939
 Sheldonia peoppigii

References 

Urocyclidae
Taxa named by César Marie Félix Ancey
Taxonomy articles created by Polbot